Vespericola columbiana, common name the northwest hesperian, is a species of air-breathing land snail, a terrestrial pulmonate gastropod mollusk in the family Polygyridae.

Subspecies 
Vespericola columbiana depressa (Pilsbry & Henderson, 1936)
Vespericola columbiana latilabrum Pilsbry, 1940

References

Polygyridae
Gastropods described in 1838